Furcula cinerea, the gray furcula moth, is a moth of the  family Notodontidae. The species was first described by Francis Walker in 1865. It is found in the United States, southern Canada and the Northwest Territories.

The wingspan is 33–45 mm. The forewings are light grey with medium grey median and subterminal areas. The hindwings are light greyish white with a dark discal spot and a terminal line of black dots. Adults are on wing from April to September in the south and from May to August in the north. There are two generations per year in the south. In the north there is only one generation.

The larvae feed on the leaves of Betula, Populus and Salix species. Larvae can be found from spring to fall in the south and from July to August in the north. The species overwinters in the pupal stage.

References

Moths described in 1865
Notodontidae
Moths of North America